The William Penn Hotel is an historic structure located at 511 F Street in San Diego's Gaslamp Quarter, in the U.S. state of California. It was built in 1920.

See also
 List of Gaslamp Quarter historic buildings

External links

 

1920 establishments in California
Buildings and structures in San Diego
Gaslamp Quarter, San Diego
Hotel buildings completed in 1920
Hotels in San Diego